Tala is a fictional supervillainess in the DC Comics universe. She first appeared as an adversary of the Phantom Stranger, but is also known for her appearances on Justice League Unlimited.

Tala is the mistress of her own part of Hell. Usually manipulating mortals into doing evil, she has also tried to unleash evil forces upon our world. Occasionally, she has allied herself with the Lords of Chaos or the evil sorcerer Tannarak, whom she has also been romantically involved with. Tala is an enemy of the Phantom Stranger, whom she has variously tried to destroy and seduce. She seems to have a gentler side, as witnessed in Tannarak's Nightclub 'Bewitched', where she has waited tables and chatted with Zatanna.

Publication history
Tala first appeared in Phantom Stranger vol. 2, #4 and was created by Neal Adams and Robert Kanigher.

Fictional character biography

Pre-Crisis
Tala is an evil mystical entity and the mistress of the Dark Circle. Her agenda often consists of tricking mortals into doing evil deeds, or unleashing the apocalypse onto the modern world. She frequently confronts the Phantom Stranger, usually along with Doctor Thirteen, by using her powers to enslave a mortal. She frequently professes an attraction to the Stranger, trying to seduce him.

Post-Crisis
Distinguished by its utilization of the series for actual supernatural phenomena and not debunking mysticism like its first incarnation, Tala is known as the nemesis of the Stranger. She is a demoness and a mistress of Hell, and her motives reflect such origins, as she is known for either trying to doom mortals' souls to ruin or aiming to unleash apocalyptic evils upon the world. She has claimed to find the Stranger attractive and is thus interested in him, but the comics have never followed through on these hints, nor are these claims known to be true.

In other media
 Tala appeared in Justice League Unlimited, voiced by Juliet Landau. This version is a member of Project Cadmus in season two and Gorilla Grodd's Secret Society in season three. While working for the former as a magic-based project leader, she is manipulated by Felix Faust into trapping herself in a mirror before eventually escaping with Grodd's help and joining his Society as their chief mystic off-screen. After Lex Luthor takes control of the Society and imprisons Grodd, Tala swears allegiance to the former and attempts to form a relationship with him until he grows increasingly obsessed with resurrecting Brainiac and regaining his former godhood. Spurned, she releases Grodd to incite a mutiny, but Luthor kills him and forces Tala to power a machine he designed to resurrect Brainiac through his essence. While she dies in the process, she resurrects Darkseid instead as a final act of revenge.
 Tala appears in issue #37 of the Justice League Unlimited tie-in comic book series.
 Tala appears in DC Universe Online. This version is a vendor in the Hall of Doom's Magic Wing and the final boss of the "Hand of Fate" DLC.

References

External links
 Tala at Comic Vine

Comics characters introduced in 1969
DC Comics demons
DC Comics female supervillains
DC Comics fantasy characters
DC Comics characters who use magic
Characters created by Robert Kanigher
Characters created by Neal Adams